Hovězí is a municipality and village in Vsetín District in the Zlín Region of the Czech Republic. It has about 2,400 inhabitants.

Etymology
The name of the municipality literally means "beef".

References

Villages in Vsetín District
Moravian Wallachia